Mahmoud Abbas, the second Chairman of the Palestine Liberation Organization and the second President of the State of Palestine, has made international trips to countries since he assumed the presidency on 9 January 2005.

Summary 
The number of visits per country where he has travelled are:

 One visit to: Algeria, Austria, Azerbaijan, Bahrain, Bangladesh, Belgium, Chile, China, Cuba, Egypt, France, Germany, Greece, Holy See, India, Iraq, Italy, Japan, Kazakhstan, Kuwait, Lebanon, Libya, Luxembourg, Mauritania, Morocco, Norway, Pakistan, Poland, Oman, Qatar, Romania, Turkey, Russia, Saudi Arabia, South Africa, Sudan, Sweden, Switzerland, Syria, Tanzania, Tunisia, United Arab Emirates, United States, Venezuela, Yemen.
 Two visits to: 
 Three visits to:

2005

2006

2007

2008

2009

2010

2011

2012

2013

2014

2015

2016

2017

2018

2019

2020

2021

2022

References

Abbas
Abbas
Abbas